142nd Division may refer to:

 142nd Division (Imperial Japanese Army)
 142nd Division (1st Formation) (People's Republic of China)
 142nd Division (3rd Formation)(People's Republic of China)
 142nd Rifle Division (Soviet Union)